Kilian Albert Merz, (KAM) better known as DJKAM is a Swiss electronic dance music (EDM) producer, dj and artist from Zürich, Switzerland. He had several chart successes mainly in Western Europe. KAM is also known as STERNENTON (chillout / downtempo / techno / techhouse), KAM-TON (ambient / meditation / soundscapes) and under his art project name KAMART (digital graphic art, crypto art, nft art) exposing his visual work in Brasil Sao Paulo, Brazil and Switzerland Zug, Switzerland. He is founder and owner of the music label KAMUSICRECORDS.

Career 
Currently he is releasing his music on his own label KAMUSICRECORDS.  Before he was signed to Big Tunes Records (Miami). formerly LoudDJs Records (Miami). and Hooki-Sonic Recordings (San Francisco). He earlier released several tracks on Plasmapool (Ger) and EML Recordings (UK). After living and working for over two years in Sao Paulo, Brazil, DJKAM returned to Zürich, Switzerland in 2015. His latest collaborations with other artists include HipHop HipHop / R&B RnB tracks with U.S. rapper BLVACK DAVINCI released 2018 and 2019, "Better Without You" House, RnB in 2015 with U.S. artist and singer IESHIA. Two tracks "Drift Away" and "Everything" House released in 2014 with former Coco Star.

In the late 1980s and early 1990s he had chart successes with tracks like "The Phonecall" and "Backfield in Motion" mainly in Western Europe. He signed 1988 worldwide with Phonogram Records GmbH (Mercury Records) in Germany as co-founder, member and co-producer of the Pop band "Kiss in the Dark (K.I.D.)". Most of K.I.D.'s music was recorded and produced at Sigma Sound Studios in New York, working with engineer/producer and Grammy Awards winner Tony Maserati.

References

External links
 DJKAM
 KAMUSICRECORDS
 STERNENTON
 KAM-TON
 KAMART

Swiss DJs
Living people
Swiss house musicians
Musicians from Zürich
Progressive house musicians
Electronic dance music DJs
Year of birth missing (living people)